Typeform may refer to:
a typeform and a platen, two flat surfaces in printing
Typeform (service), an online form and survey building website